Daniel Osborne may refer to:

 Daniel Osborne, 12th Baronet, of the Osborne baronets
 Danny Osborne (born 1949), English artist
 Dan Osborne (born 1991), cast member of The Only Way Is Essex
 Daniel Osborne, drummer in Officer Negative
 Daniel Osborne, drummer in The Pineapple Thief

See also
 Daniel Osbourne (disambiguation)